Group D of the 2021 Rugby League World Cup is one of the four groups in the 2021 Rugby League World Cup, which will be played in 2022. The group comprises automatic qualifiers Tonga and Papua New Guinea as well as Wales, who qualified through the 2018 European Championship and Cook Islands, who qualified through the repechage tournament.

The pool draw was made on 16 January 2020. The fixtures were announced on 21 July 2020. A revised schedule was issued on 19 November 2021 following the postponement of the tournament from 2021 to 2022.

Standings

Matches

Tonga vs Papua New Guinea

Wales vs Cook Islands

Tonga vs Wales

Papua New Guinea vs Cook Islands

Tonga vs Cook Islands

Papua New Guinea vs Wales

References

External links 

 https://www.rlwc2021.com/

2021 Rugby League World Cup